Kathryn Anne "Kate" Gill (born 10 December 1984) is an Australian soccer player who played the majority of her career in Australia, in the Women's National Soccer League (WNSL) and the W-League. She also played in Sweden in the Damallsvenskan. Between 2004 and 2015, Gill played 86 matches for the Australia women's national soccer team. She is a striker that is strong in the air and on the ball and possesses great finishing and first touch.

Born in New Zealand and schooled in Australia, Gill graduated from Hunter Valley Grammar School in 2002.

Playing career

Club career 

Gill played for the Northern NSW Pride in the Australian Women's National Soccer League.

In 2008, Gill played for the Newcastle Jets in the W-League, before moving to Sweden where she played with Sunnanå SK of Skellefteå in the Damallsvenskan league during 2009. In the upcoming winter, she moved to LdB Malmö for the 2010 season.

International career 

Gill made her debut for Australia in 2004 against New Zealand in Brisbane. As of July 2014 she has played 83 times and scored 40 goals for the Matildas.

Career statistics

International goals
Scores and results list Australia's goal tally first.

Goals by opponent

Post-football career
In 2016, Gill announced her retirement from playing. In 2020, Gill became a joint chief executive of the Professional Footballers Australia, the Australia soccer players union.

Honours

Club
LdB FC Malmö
 Damallsvenskan: 2010

Perth Glory
 W-League Premiership: 2014

Country
Australia
 AFC Women's Asian Cup: 2010
 OFC U-20 Women's Championship: 2002

Individual
 AFC Women's Player of the Year: 2010
 W-League Golden Boot: 2012–13, 2014

See also

 Women's association football in Australia

References

External links

1984 births
Living people
Australian women's soccer players
Australian people of New Zealand descent
Newcastle Jets FC (A-League Women) players
Perth Glory FC (A-League Women) players
Sunnanå SK players
AIK Fotboll (women) players
Linköpings FC players
Damallsvenskan players
A-League Women players
Expatriate women's footballers in Sweden
Australia women's international soccer players
2007 FIFA Women's World Cup players
Australian expatriate women's soccer players
Australian expatriate sportspeople in Sweden
FC Rosengård players
Women's association football forwards
Association footballers from Auckland
Sportswomen from New South Wales
Soccer players from New South Wales